Olavo is a given name, the Spanish and Portuguese form of Olaf, and may refer to:

Olavo Bilac (1865–1918), Brazilian poet of the Parnassian school
Olavo Setúbal (1923–2008), Brazilian industrialist, banker and politician
Olavo Rodrigues Barbosa (1923–2010), Brazilian football (soccer) player
Olavo Yépez (1937–2021), Ecuadorian chess master
Olavo de Carvalho (1947–2022), Brazilian journalist and writer